was a Japanese football player. He played for the Japan national team.

National team career
In May 1925, when Madono was a Kwansei Gakuin University student, he was selected Japan national team for 1925 Far Eastern Championship Games in Manila. At this competition, on May 17, he debuted against Philippines. On May 20, he also played against Republic of China. But Japan lost in both matches (0-4, v Philippines and 0-2, v Republic of China). He played 2 games for Japan in 1925.

National team statistics

References

External links
 
 Japan National Football Team Database

Year of birth missing
Year of death missing
Kwansei Gakuin University alumni
Japanese footballers
Japan international footballers
Association football midfielders